Yengi Kahriz (also Romanized as Yengī Kahrīz, Yangī Gahrīz, Yangī Kahrīz, Yang-ī-Kārīz, and Yang Kārīz) is a village in Ebrahimabad Rural District, Ramand District, Buin Zahra County, Qazvin Province, Iran. At the 2006 census, its population was 173, in 48 families.

References 

Populated places in Buin Zahra County